Tauno is a masculine given name found most commonly in Estonia and Finland. Tauno may refer to:
Tauno Hannikainen (1896–1968), Finnish cellist and conductor
Tauno Honkanen(born 1927), Finnish skier and Olympic competitor 
Tauno Ilmoniemi (1893–1934), Finnish gymnast and diver and Olympic competitor
Tauno Kangro (born 1966), Estonian sculptor 
Tauno Käyhkö (born 1950) Finnish ski jumper and Olympic competitor
Tauno Kovanen (1917–1986), Finnish wrestler and Olympic medalist
Tauno Lampola (1903–1969), Finnish modern pentathlete and Olympic competitor
Tauno Lappalainen (1898–1973), Finnish cross country skier and Olympic competitor
Tauno Luiro (1932–1955), Finnish ski jumper and Olympic competitor 
Tauno Mäki (1912–1983), Finnish sport shooter and Olympic medalist 
Tauno Marttinen (1912–2008), Finnish composer
Tauno Nurmi (1922–2014), Finnish motorcycle racing driver
Tauno Palo (1908–1982), Finnish actor and singer
Tauno Sipilä (1921-2001), Finnish cross country skier and Olympic competitor
Tauno Söder (1927–2009), Finnish television and film actor 
Tauno Tiusanen (born 1941), Finnish professor emeritus of University of Glasgow and Lappeenranta University of Technology

Estonian masculine given names
Finnish masculine given names